Oasis is a non-carbonated bottled soft drink, a product of Orangina Schweppes. In the UK it is manufactured by the Coca-Cola EuroPacific Partners in conjunction with Coca-Cola Company subsidiary Atlantic Industries and in the Republic of Ireland it is distributed by Coca-Cola HBC Ireland. It originated in France by Volvic in 1966 and initially distributed under the name 'Pulse', until flagging sales led to a rebrand and its current name 'Oasis' being introduced. The drink is described as a "fruit juice drink - with sugar and sweeteners". In May 2013, Oasis was imported to stores and supermarkets around the Ivory Coast, and by the end of 2013, Oasis was imported to stores and supermarkets around Madagascar.

Advertising 
Advertising campaigns for Oasis target adults and promote the drink as an alternative to water. The drink was promoted in a TV advertising campaign in Britain with the well-known entertainer and actor Mike Reid, who at the time was at the height of his fame as Frank Butcher in EastEnders. One phrase has been "Open, pour. Be yourself once more.".

Oasis' advertising campaign "Run Cactus Kid Run" features a human-cactus hybrid known as Cactus Boy, as he goes on the run with his lover, a young girl from Kansas, Cactus Girl, who is pregnant with his strange cactus baby.  These advertisements are loosely based on the film Badlands, using the same music. Following 32 complaints, the advert was banned by the Advertising Standards Authority, citing it could have been interpreted as promoting teenage pregnancy.

A follow-up campaign depicted Rubberduckzilla, a giant rubber duck who invades a Japanese city, destroying anything with water in its sight.

A new campaign in 2011 featured a bottle of Oasis and a Scotch egg.

In 2012, Oasis launched its new slogan, "Be Fruit".

Varieties 
In April 2014, it was announced on many news websites that Coca-Cola UK will be entering the "on the go" squash market with their new Oasis Mighty Drops. These became available in mid-May with the flavours Mixed Berry, Mango and Raspberry Lemonade.

On in at 2018 Coca-Cola European Partners (CCEP) is introducing a new range of flavoured waters, Oasis Aquashock and plans a brand refresh across its Oasis portfolio in May.

Mascots
These mascots are used in France

The fruits
 Alan anas : (voice Franck Dubosc)
 Mangue Debol : (voice Elie Semoun (2004-2012), Willy Rovelli (since 2012))
 Orange Preslé : (voice Titouan Lamazou (2004-2012), Arsène Mosca (since 2012))
 Enrico Labricot : (voice Alain Gauthier (2004-2012), Jeremy Michalak (since 2012))
 Eva Lapèche : (Voice Noelle Perma (2004-2012), Jenny Del Pino (since 2012))

References

External links

Coca-Cola brands
Soft drinks